Macarena Rocío Reyes Meneses (born 30 March 1984 in San Fernando, Chile) is a Chilean athlete who competes in the long jump and heptathlon.

She holds national records in the long jump, triple jump and heptathlon.

Competition record

References

 

1984 births
Living people
Chilean female long jumpers
Heptathletes
People from San Fernando, Chile
Chilean sportswomen
World Athletics Championships athletes for Chile
Athletes (track and field) at the 2015 Pan American Games
Athletes (track and field) at the 2019 Pan American Games
Pan American Games competitors for Chile
South American Games silver medalists for Chile
South American Games bronze medalists for Chile
South American Games medalists in athletics
Competitors at the 2014 South American Games
Athletes (track and field) at the 2018 South American Games
21st-century Chilean women